Cephas Speak (2 April 1873 – 18 December 1958) was a British trade union leader who served as secretary of the United Textile Factory Workers' Association.

Speak grew up in Burnley, and began working at a local cotton mill as a loom sweeper when he was ten years old.  He became active in the Burnley Weavers' Association, and after twenty-five years was employed part-time as the assistant secretary of the Oldham Weavers' Association.  After a few months, he left this job to become assistant secretary of the Bolton Weavers' Association, then in 1910, he became the first full-time secretary of the Bolton Weavers.  The following year, he was also appointed as a magistrate in Bolton.

In 1931, Speak was additionally elected as secretary of the United Textile Factory Workers' Association, serving until 1943.  He finally retired from his Bolton Weavers post in 1948, at the age of 77, having held the position for 38 years.

References

1873 births
1958 deaths
General Secretaries of the United Textile Factory Workers' Association
People from Burnley